Three Waltzes (French: Les trois valses) is a 1938 French historical musical film directed by Ludwig Berger and starring Yvonne Printemps, Pierre Fresnay and Henri Guisol. It is an operetta film, based on music by Oscar Straus. The film's sets were designed by the art directors Jean d'Eaubonne, Raymond Gabutti and Jacques Gut.

Cast

References

Bibliography 
 Diffrient, David Scott. Omnibus Films: Theorizing Transauthorial Cinema. Edinburgh University Press, 2014.

External links 
 

1938 films
1930s historical musical films
French historical musical films
1930s French-language films
Films directed by Ludwig Berger
Films based on operettas
Operetta films
Films set in France
Films set in the 1860s
Films set in the 1900s
Cultural depictions of Napoleon III
Cultural depictions of Sarah Bernhardt
French black-and-white films
1930s French films